Jan Kopp (born May 26, 1970, in Frankfurt/Main, Germany) is a German visual artist. He has lived in France since 1991.

Overview 
After graduating in 1996 from National School of Fine Arts of Paris / École nationale supérieure des Beaux-Arts/, France, he became assistant to the artists :fr:Jochen Gerz and :fr:Esther Shalev Gerz. In 1997 he co-founded the independent art-space GlassBox in Paris, one of the first artist-run-spaces in the French capital. Jan Kopp has been in several international artist-in-residence programs such as PS1/Moma   with the Clockwork 2000: P.S.1 & Clocktower National and International Studio Program 1999-2000 in New York and Hors les Murs/Institut Français in Brazil with "Niemeyer dancing, playing with modernity, run the streets" as a subject of his residence  in 2014.

Work 
Jan Kopp uses different medias – drawing, sound, video, sculpture, performance, - without favoring one or the other. He resists to any temptation of specialization or classification. His works can be small drawings or large-scale installations such as Soulever le monde, created for the Children's gallery of Centre Pompidou, Paris in 2015 or Grand Ensemble' for the Contemporary art center La Criée in Rennes, France. In the most of large-scale installations, the visitor can take part of the work by touching or making in movement one element of it or only by this presence. For instance Das endlose Spiel / The Endless game challenges the visitor as to the nature of both his role and his participation: he can take part in this interplay of tension between the visible and the sensory only by making his way along the ellipse of "Das endlose Spiel's" platform. As Gaétane Lamarche-Vadel said, Kopp shares with Kawamata inclinations for simple materials, economic, common, clear paths, the incompleteness of the work, make a collective. Most of times, he uses many everyday objects to speak to everyone by putting them out of their usual context. By this move we can see the world differential, the artist says. Jan Kopp seeks to create artworks which don't reveal themselves in one glance. They could appear in one way to the visitor then show a different side or give new meanings another day. The visitors don't see the same thing. The artist is always in a position to create links between art, territory and society. A major exhibition was devoted to him at the Maubuisson abbey (Val d’Oise, France) in 2011. Le Tourniquet (2011), the fruit of an experiment on the drawing medium, can be visited in three places, the Collège des Bernardins in Paris, at Fresnoy in the group exhibition Visions fugitives and at the FRAC Alsace for Affinités déchirures & attractions.
In 2015, Jan Kopp, was selected to develop an artistic research in Mulhouse (France)  and Kassell (Germany) on the topic of immigration, social memory and expressions of living together in the city. He worked closely with civil society actors, academics and cultural Mulhouse.

 Solo exhibitions 
 2015 : Soulever le monde Children's gallery of the Centre Georges Pompidou, Paris, France
 2015 : Constellations ordinaires,  Laurence Bernard Gallery, Geneva, Switzerland 
 2013 : Un grand ensemble and Les horizons, La Criée, Contemporary art center, Rennes, France
 2011 : La courbe ritournelle, Contemporary art center, Abbaye de Maubuisson, France
 2010 : Das endlose Spiel / Le jeu sans fin, Kunstraum Dornbirn, Austria
 2009 : "Kammerspiel", Martos Gallery, New York, NY
 2008 : :fr:Fonds régional d'art contemporain (FRAC) Alsace, France
 2008 : Centre d’art Bastille, Grenoble, France

 Group exhibitions 
 2014 : Ligne de front, Lab Labanque- Artois comm, Givenchy-lès-la-Bassée, France
 2013 : Le Nouveau Festival, Centre Georges Pompidou, Paris, France
 2011 : Architecture, Utopies, Dessin, MNAC, Bucharest, Romania 
 2010 : Res Publica, MMOMA, Moscou, Russia
 2010 : "Fragile, Terres d'empathie", Daejeon Museum of Art, Daejeon, South Korea
 2009 : Fragile, Contemporary art Museum, St Etienne  
 2008 : Translation, MMOMA, Moscou, Russia 
 2008 : Crisi, Angels Barcelona, Spain 
 2005 : Singuliers, Modern Art Museum, Canton, China
 2004 : I need You, Kunsthaus Biel/Bienne, Suisse 
 2002 : Traversée, Paris Modern Art Museum, France
 2001 : Sixth Biennial of Contemporary Art of Lyon, France 
 2000 : Clockwork'', PS1/MOMA, New York, USA.

Public collections 
 Im Treibhaus, Collection Neuflize Vie ABN / AMRO
 Quelques mouvements cycliques, Collection publique d'art contemporain du Conseil général de la Seine-Saint-Denis, France
 News from an unbuilt city, Fonds National d'Art Contemporain, Paris, France. Currently part of the permanent collection in MAC Lyon, France
 Drawings for "No Paraderan," Fonds National d'Art Contemporain, Paris France
 Taming the Alien/Final Races, Fonds National d'Art Contemporain, Paris, France
 Westlich, Fonds National d'Art Contemporain, Paris, France
 Amoco, Frac Ile-de-France, France
 Monstres (rep.), Frac Ile-de-France, France
 Nowherelands, Frac Champagne-Ardenne, France

Bibliography

Monographs 
 2015: Jan Kopp - Soulever le monde - Editions Filigranes (Centre Pompidou-Paris et La Criée, centre d'art contemporain, Rennes), Paris, 80 pages, Tanguy Viel's textes 
 2011: Jan Kopp - La Courbe de la ritournelle - Editions Filigranes, Paris, 96 pages,  2011
 2010: Jan Kopp : Das endlose Spiel - Le jeu sans fin- Verlag für moderne Kunst Nürnberg, 2010
 2005: Jan Kopp : Techniques Rappolder - Boulbes .C, Claustres .A, Lageira .J, Isthme éditions, Paris, 127 pages, 2005
 2000: Ausgestellt / Vorgestellt V - Marl, Skulpturenmuseum Glaskasten, 2000
 1998: Jan Kopp - Paris, Glassbox, 1998

Collectif catalogs and books 
 2015: Suspended Spaces #3. Inachever la Modernité. Editions d'école des Beaux Arts de Paris
 2014: A posteriori - 10 ans centre d'art contemporain, La Maréchalerie, Versailles, 
 2013: Chronique du chantier - Gaëtane Lamarche-Vadel, Les presses du réel, 320 pages, 2013
Pièces montrées - Frac Alsace, Musée de la Ville de Strasbourg, Fondation Fernet-Branca, textes d’Olivier Grasser,..., 184 pages, 2013
Théâtre des expositions 3 : Il retro del manifesto - Académie de France à Rome – Villa Medicis, avec les oeuvres de Katinka Bock, Ulla von Brandenburg, Laurent Montaron,...., 92 pages, 2013
 2011: Suspended Spaces #2 -  Une expérience collective, Black Jack Editions, 272 pages, 2012
Question d'artistes - interview with Alain Berland : "Une production en négatif", Collège des Bernardins, Paris
 2011: Suspended Spaces #1 -  textes de Victor Burgin, Françoise Coblence, Claire Mauss Copeaux et Etienne Copeaux, Jacinto Lageira, Seloua Luste Boulbina, Paul Ardenne, Lionel Ruffel, Etienne Balibar, Ghislaine Glasson Deschaumes, Françoise Parfait ... Black Jack Editions, 300 pages, 2011
 2010: Un plan simple, Paris, B42 -  Cedric Schönwald, Florence Ostende, Remi Parcollet, Maxime Thieffine, 148 pages, 2010
 2009: Fragile - Terres d'empathie / fields of empathy - Saint-Etienne, musée d'art moderne, Milan, Skira editore, 2009 
Collection - Musee d’art contemporain de Lyon, 5 Continents Editions, Milan, 2009
 2008: Remakes, Video sobre Cine - Fondacion municipal de cultura, Gijon, 2008
4 AM - quatre ans d'art à la Maréchalerie - La Maréchalerie - Centre d'art contemporain et Archibooks + sautereau éditeur, 87 pages,  2008
 2007: Photographies Modernes et Contemporaines : La Collection Neuflize Vie - de Régis Durand, Dominique Baqué, Flammarion Éditions, 166 pages, 2007
F.I.S.Co. - Today is ok, Éditions - Xing, 2007
The Lost Moment - Bik Van der Pol, 2007
 2006: Festival photo et vidéo de Biarritz - Isthme éditions, Mai 2006
 2005: Catalogue de la collection publique du Conseil Général de la Seine-Saint-Denis - CG93, Jeanne van der Portal, 2005
Only Connect - Ramade B., Froger G., Goudinoux V., Renau O., Balau R., Isthme éditions - Art Connexion, Dec. 2005
Singuliers - Musée d'Art du Guangdong, 2005
 2004: Célébration! 20 ans du FRAC Champagne-Ardenne - Le Collège édition / Frac Champagne-Ardenne, 2004
Projet Cône Sud - FRAC Ile de France et FRAC Poitou Charente, 2004
Cosmique Bled Ou des corps mobiles dans l'espace – Ateliers des Arques -Musée Zakdine, Paris, 2004
I need you - Centre PasquArt Kunsthaus Centre d'art, Bienne, Suisse, 2004
 2003: L'oeil de la nuit - Nuit blanche parcours Paris rive gauche, Paris Musées, 2003
 2002: L'art politique - Ecole d'art de Brest, 2002
Ateliers 19972002 - Centre national de la photographie, 2002
True Truth about the nearly Real - Künstlerhaus Mousonturm (4th International Summer Academy), 2002
 2001: Traversées - Paris, ARC - Musée d'Art Moderne de la Ville de Paris, 2001
Connivence - Biennale de Lyon, 2001
Paysages d'entre-villes - Paris, Musée Zadkine, 2001
Clockwork 2000 - New York, PS1, 2000
 2000: Fido : télévision - Hunter College Art Gallery, New York, 2000
La Ville, le jardin, la Mémoire - Rome, Villa Médicis, 2000
 1993-99: Nous nous sommes tant aimés - Paris, École nationale supérieure des Beaux-Arts, 1999
Entre fictions - Arles, Actes Sud, 1998

Contes à rebours - Kunsthalle Palazzo, Liestal, Jahreskatalog, 1998

Caravan 96 - Taegu, 1996

Monument et modernité - Paris, Délégation aux Arts Plastiques - Ville de Paris, 1996

Traces sonores - Paris, École nationale supérieure des Beaux-Arts, 1995

Traces 12 - Paris, École nationale supérieure des Beaux-Arts, 1993

References

External links 
 Jan Kopp website
 Galerie Eva Meyer
 Galerie Laurence Bernard
 Suspended Spaces

1970 births
German emigrants to France
Artists from Frankfurt
Living people